"Luyag Ko Tan Yaman" (Pangasinan for "My Province and Treasure"), also known by its Filipino title "Pangasinan Aking Yaman" ("Pangasinan My Treasure"), and generally referred to as the Pangasinan Hymn, is the official anthem of the province of Pangasinan in the Philippines.

History
A provincial hymn for Pangasinan was conceptualized during the governorship of Amado Espino Jr., as part of a wider push to promote and reinvigorate the Pangasinan language and the province's cultural heritage.

In 2008, Espino commissioned veteran radio broadcaster and singer Raul "Insiyong" Tamayo, known for his novelty songs, to write the song, which would become Pangasinan's first provincial hymn. Tamayo then wrote "Luyag Ko Tan Yaman", which Espino introduced under its Filipino title, "Pangasinan Aking Yaman", when it was performed for the first time at the Pangasinan Provincial Capitol in Lingayen on January 27, 2008. Filipino lyrics for the hymn were also subsequently written.

Three years later on September 5, 2011, the Sangguniang Panlalawigan of Pangasinan passed Provincial Ordinance No. 154-2011, which officially declared "Luyag Ko Tan Yaman" as the official hymn of the province. The song was then officially performed for the first time during the launch of the province's "I Love Pangasinan" tourism campaign at the start of Pangasinan's tourism month on September 12, 2011, and later that month the provincial government embarked on a school tour to introduce the song to students throughout Pangasinan.

Aside from promoting and reinvigorating the Pangasinan language and culture of Pangasinan, the adoption of "Luyag Ko Tan Yaman" was also part of a narrower push on the part of the Pangasinan provincial government to adopt official symbols, including a new provincial flag and seal which were adopted in 2017.

Lyrics
Although "Luyag Ko Tan Yaman" has lyrics in Pangasinan and Filipino, only the Pangasinan lyrics were given official status by the Sangguniang Panlalawigan. Additionally there are no lyrics in Ilocano, which is the predominant language in the province's eastern and western peripheries. Instead, the provincial government has encouraged people living in Ilocano-speaking areas to sing the hymn in Pangasinan, which is primarily spoken in the central part of the province.

Tamayo notes that the lyrics of the song reflects his pride at being Pangasinense, which he says all residents of Pangasinan should feel. At its first performance in 2008, Espino remarked that the song will help remind Pangasinenses of their history and heritage, likewise hoping that it stirs love for the province.

The lyrics have also been interpreted as helping to instill a sense of pride in the best qualities of Pangasinan.

References

External links
Official videos of the Pangasinan Hymn, produced by the Provincial Information Office of Pangasinan:

Regional songs
Culture of Pangasinan
Asian anthems
Philippine anthems
National anthem compositions in G major